Gayatri Patel Bahl is an American actress, filmmaker, and Indian classical dancer, who appears in Hindi and English language films.

Biography

Personal life
Patel was born and raised in United States in a Gujarati family. She studied at Emory University in Atlanta, Georgia.

Career
Before starting her career as an actress with the film Let's Dance, Patel Bahl performed in many dance competitions. During her time at Emory, she won Miss India Georgia.  She was also first runner-up in the Miss India United States competition. She has participated in classic English plays at Emory University, performing roles such as Irina for Chekhov's Play, Three Sisters.

While in India, Patel Bahl starred in four music videos produced by Venus Films and starring herself opposite Jugal Hansraj. Her debut film in Bollywood is Let's Dance. She guest starred in Yash Raj's Rishta.com as Husna in episode 19 of season 1.

Moving back to New York City, Patel Bahl  has guest starred on FBI Most Wanted, Partner Track, New Amsterdam 2018 TV Series, Law & Order SVU and appeared in Martin Scorsese's Vinyl, Mr. Robot, and Showtime's Loudest Voice.

In April 2017, Patel Bahl was featured in Elle Magazine US as a part of the Elle Magazine's Movement Series.

She is the writer, director, co-producer and star of the award-winning short film, TINA.

Training
Patel has taken training in Kathak from various teachers. At 15, she went to Bangalore and was trained by Maya Rao. In Mumbai, she took training from Vijayshree Chaudhary, who herself trained under Pandit Birju Maharaj in Delhi for about 10–12 years.

For fluency in Hindi language, she started training with Satyadev Dubey along with sitting in on Makrand Deshpande's rehearsals. She also trained with Veena Mehta, who trained the cast of Jaane Tu Ya Jaane Na.

Filmography
 As actress 

 As filmmaker

See also
 Let's Dance
 List of Indian film actresses

Notes

External links

Gayatri Bahl Official Website - Archived

1980s births
Living people
American film actresses
American actresses of Indian descent
American people of Gujarati descent
American expatriate actresses in India
Actresses in Hindi cinema
Actresses in Hindi television
Emory University alumni
21st-century American women
21st-century American actresses